HMS Baffin was an  trawler of the Royal Navy. Constructed in Canada for the Royal Navy, the trawler was one of eight loaned to the Royal Canadian Navy during the Second World War. The vessel was mostly engaged in minesweeping duties out of Halifax, Nova Scotia. Following the war, Baffin was returned to the Royal Navy. The vessel was then sold into mercantile service. The vessel was broken up in 1983.

Design and description
The Isles class were a series of anti-submarine trawlers constructed for the Royal Navy. A development of the earlier , 145 were constructed during the war. The Isles-class trawlers displaced  standard and
 at deep load.

The trawlers were propelled by one shaft driven by one vertical triple expansion engine powered by steam provided by a one-cylinder boiler. Baffin, being constructed in Canada, was armed with a single QF 12-pounder 12 cwt gun and three Oerlikon 20 mm cannons for anti-aircraft defence. They had a complement between 35 and 40 officers and ratings.

Service history
The ship's keel was laid down by Collingwood Shipyards at Collingwood, Ontario on 14 October 1941. The ship was launched on 13 April 1942. The vessel was lent to the Royal Canadian Navy, but was never commissioned into it and was manned by a Royal Navy crew. The vessel was completed on 20 August 1942. Named for Baffin Island, as all the vessels loaned to Canada were named for Canadian islands, the ship saw service at Halifax performing anti-submarine duties.

Returned by the Royal Canadian Navy on 20 August 1945, the ship was sold for mercantile use on in October 1945. In 1947 the vessel was converted to a  trawler under the same name, registered to Harbour Specialties Ltd out of London. In 1952 the vessel was sold to F.Osterwisch & Co KG and rebuilt with a new diesel engine, becoming the  cargo ship Niedermehnen.  The ship was sold in 1965 Hans Petersen and renamed Kellenhusen. In 1969, the vessel was sold to Hans Thiessen and renamed Kairos. The vessel became Theoxenia after being sold to Grigorios Karlovits & Fotini Papadopoulou in 1981. Theoxenia was purchased two more times, retaining her name. The ship was broken up in 1983, and eventually deleted from Lloyd's Register in 1995.

References

Notes

Citations

Sources
 
 
 

Ships of the Royal Canadian Navy
Isles-class trawlers of the Royal Canadian Navy
Ships built in Collingwood, Ontario
1942 ships
World War II minesweepers of Canada